Saint Kitts and Nevis is a two-island country in the West Indies. Located in the Leeward Islands chain of the Lesser Antilles, it is the smallest sovereign state in the Americas, in both area and population. The country is a Commonwealth realm, with the British monarch (currently King Charles III) as head of state.

The country's economy is characterised by its dominant tourism, agriculture and light manufacturing industries. Sugar was the primary export from the 1940s on, but rising production costs, low world market prices, and the government's efforts to reduce dependence on it have led to a growing diversification of the agricultural sector. In 2005, the government decided to close down the state-owned sugar company, which had experienced losses and was a significant contributor to the fiscal deficit.

Notable firms 
This list includes notable companies with primary headquarters located in the country. The industry and sector follow the Industry Classification Benchmark taxonomy. Organizations which have ceased operations are included and noted as defunct.

References

Saint Kitts and Nevis
 
Companies
Saint Kitts and Nevis

Companies